Shrawan Kumar is an Indian politician from Janata Dal (United). He is the Minister of Rural Development and Parliamentary Affairs in the Bihar Cabinet under Nitish Kumar.

His political career started from JP Movement and has been an MLA from Nalanda constituency since 1995. He is the chief whip of Janata Dal (United) in Bihar Vidhan Sabha. He is considered close to Nitish Kumar and also member of Samata Party (now led by Uday Mandal its President).

References

1957 births
Living people
Samata Party politicians
Janata Dal politicians
Janata Dal (United) politicians
People from Nalanda
Bihar MLAs 2020–2025